Cataclysmiini is a tribe of geometer moths in subfamily Larentiinae.

Taxonomy
Genera included in this tribe are:
Cataclysme Hübner, 1825
Paraplaneta Warren, 1895
Phibalapteryx Stephens, 1829
Piercia Janse, 1933

References

 
Larentiinae